Thomas Marion Eaton (August 3, 1896 – September 16, 1939) served briefly as a U.S. Representative from California in 1939.

Biography
Born on a farm near Edwardsville, Illinois, Eaton attended the public schools.
He graduated from the State Normal School (now Illinois State University) in Normal in 1917. He served as principal of a grade school in Clinton, Illinois, in 1917 and 1918. During the First World War served in the United States Navy as an ensign.

He moved to Long Beach, California, in 1921 and engaged in the automobile sales business.

Eaton was elected to the Long Beach City Council in 1934. He was reelected in 1936, and was unanimously chosen mayor by the council.

Eaton was elected as a Republican to the Seventy-sixth Congress and served from January 3, 1939, until his death in Long Beach, California, September 16, 1939. Eaton's seat remained vacant until his elected successor, William Ward Johnson, took office in January 1941. He was interred in Sunnyside Memorial Gardens, later known as Forest Lawn Memorial Park (Long Beach).

See also
 List of United States Congress members who died in office (1900–49)

References

1896 births
1939 deaths
Mayors of Long Beach, California
California city council members
United States Navy officers
Republican Party members of the United States House of Representatives from California
20th-century American politicians
People from Edwardsville, Illinois
Military personnel from California
Military personnel from Illinois
Burials at Forest Lawn Memorial Park (Long Beach)